Dehnow (also Romanized as Deh-i-Nau and Dehnau) is a village in Belharat Rural District, Miyan Jolgeh District, Nishapur County, Razavi Khorasan Province, Iran. At the 2006 census, its population was 251, in 67 families.

References 

Populated places in Nishapur County